The 1976 Tennessee Volunteers football team (variously "Tennessee", "UT" or the "Vols") represented the University of Tennessee in the 1976 NCAA Division I football season. Playing as a member of the Southeastern Conference (SEC), the team was led by head coach Bill Battle, in his seventh year, and played their home games at Neyland Stadium in Knoxville, Tennessee. They finished the season with a record of six wins and five losses (6–5 overall, 2–4 in the SEC). The Volunteers offense scored 237 points while the defense allowed 162 points.

Schedule

Roster
PK Jimmy Gaylor
QB Joe Hough
Roland James (defense)
RB Stanley Morgan 
QB Randy Wallace

Team players drafted into the NFL

Reference:

References

Tennessee
Tennessee Volunteers football seasons
Tennessee Volunteers football